James Gordon Thomas Clayton (9 July 1910 – 1976) was an English professional footballer who played as a centre forward for Wolverhampton Wanderers, Aston Villa and Burnley.
Please note that JGC was born in 1913 and died in 1998 aged 85.

Career
Clayton joined Wolverhampton Wanderers in October 1932 from Shotton Colliery in October 1932, later making his debut on 21 April 1934 in a 1–5 loss at Newcastle United. He made only a handful of appearances over the following seasons until the 1936–37 season when he enjoyed an established run in the team, scoring 29 times, as the club finished fifth in the First Division.

After making a bright start to the following season, he was purchased by Aston Villa in October 1937. He immediately helped them win the Second Division championship but stayed only 12 months before joining Burnley in October 1938.

He retired in 1945 after having guested for Swansea City during World War II.

References
 

1910 births
1976 deaths
Footballers from Sunderland
English footballers
Association football forwards
Wolverhampton Wanderers F.C. players
Aston Villa F.C. players
Burnley F.C. players
English Football League players